Mampeza is a stream in Kinshasa, the Democratic Republic of the Congo.

References

Rivers of the Democratic Republic of the Congo
Kinshasa